Leon White may refer to:
Leon White or Big Van Vader (1955–2018), American professional wrestler who was also an American football offensive lineman
Leon White (linebacker) (born 1963), American football defensive player
Leon White (musician) (born 1950), American musician

See also
Len White (disambiguation)
Leonard White (disambiguation)